Başak Eraydın (born 21 June 1994) is a Turkish professional tennis player.

She has won 15 singles and 18 doubles titles on the ITF Circuit. On 2 April 2018, she reached her best singles ranking of world No. 156. On 6 June 2016, she peaked at No. 151 in the doubles rankings.

Playing for the Turkey Fed Cup team, Eraydın has a win–loss record of 5–7.

Career
In 2012, Eraydın won seven singles and five doubles titles on the ITF Circuit.

In April 2017, she won the inaugural 2017 Lale Cup in Istanbul, a $60k event, by defeating Petra Krejsová in straight sets in the final. A week later, Eraydın advanced to her first ever WTA Tour quarterfinal, at the 2017 İstanbul Cup.

ITF Circuit finals

Singles: 27 (15 titles, 12 runner–ups)

Doubles: 38 (18 titles, 20 runner–ups)

Other finals

Singles

Doubles

References

External links

 
 
 

1994 births
Living people
Sportspeople from Ankara
Turkish female tennis players
Competitors at the 2018 Mediterranean Games
Mediterranean Games gold medalists for Turkey
Mediterranean Games medalists in tennis
21st-century Turkish sportswomen